Stanley Feldman may refer to:

 Stanley Feldman (political scientist), American professor of political science
 Stanley G. Feldman (born 1933), former Arizona Supreme Court judge